State Route 93 (SR 93) is part of Maine's system of numbered state highways, located in Oxford County.  It is a minor highway in the western part of the state, running  from U.S. Route 302 (US 302) in Bridgton to SR 5 in Lovell.  It is signed as a north-south highway, but runs roughly southeast-to-northwest.

Route description
The road leaves town to the northwest, paralleling Highland Lake and Stearns Pond as it enters the town of Sweden. SR 93 continues northwest until reaching Waterford Road, where it turns due west towards the town of Lovell. Shortly after crossing the town line, SR 93 reaches its northern terminus at SR 5.

History

Major intersections

See also

References

External links

Floodgap Roadgap's RoadsAroundME: Maine State Route 93

093
Transportation in Oxford County, Maine